Armijn Hemel is a technology consultant and noted watchman of free software. He is part of the gpl-violations.org core team, who have won several court cases against different companies, including D-Link and Skype, for violating the terms of the GNU General Public License.

Biography 

Hemel was born in the late 1970s and grew up in the town of Tiel, Netherlands.

References

External links 
armijn on Identi.ca microblogging service
Open Advice Author Armijn Hemel
Contributor to Hackvalue - Tales from the trenches of specialized web hosting and development, the corporate blog of Loco.

Year of birth missing (living people)
Living people
People from Tiel
Free software people